Gabriele Sala (born 27 September 1967) is an Italian gymnast. He competed at the 1988 Summer Olympics and the 1992 Summer Olympics.

References

External links
 

1967 births
Living people
Italian male artistic gymnasts
Olympic gymnasts of Italy
Gymnasts at the 1988 Summer Olympics
Gymnasts at the 1992 Summer Olympics
Sportspeople from Brescia